Origin Unknown were an English electronic music duo comprising Andy C and Ant Miles. Producing drum and bass music, they are best known for their 1993 song "Valley of the Shadows", originally released as the B-side of "The Touch", before its re-release as a standalone single in 1996, both through Andy C's RAM Records.

In addition to this, the duo's 2002 re-release of their 1995 song "Truly One" entered the UK Singles and UK Dance singles charts at positions 53 and seven respectively, and they also produced "Hotness" with Dynamite MC for his 2004 debut studio album, World of Dynamite. They have also remixed music for acts including DJ Hype, Dieselboy, Adam F, Adam Freeland and High Contrast. The duo would later form Ram Trilogy with fellow producer Shimon.

Discography

References

British drum and bass music groups
Musical groups established in 1990
English electronic music duos
Drum and bass duos